Moritz-Maria von Igelfeld is the main character in a series of short, humorous novels by Scottish author Alexander McCall Smith.

In the books, Von Igelfeld is depicted as:
a "Professor Dr"
proud, stoic, and unable or unwilling to admit or face failure or imminent disaster in his professional or personal life (frequently the basis for the humour in these novels)
a philologist
the author of a fictional book Portuguese Irregular Verbs, described as "the seminal work on Romance philology" and "a lengthy book of some twelve hundred pages"
proud of his aristocratic German heritage
an academic at the fictional Institute of Romance Philology in Regensburg, Germany
a colleague of the other major characters of the book series, Professor Dr Dr (honoris causa) Florianus Prinzel and Professor Dr Detlev Amadeus Unterholzer
a compound word name in the German language meaning "hedgehog field" (compounded from igel = hedgehog and feld = field)

tall
born on May Day, 1 May
initially a student in Heidelberg, Germany
the second for his friend Prinzel's duel, which he had mistakenly arranged in a drunken discussion
a doctoral student of Professor Dr Dr Dr Dieter Vogelsang, in Munich, Germany, studying Celtic philology and in particular Early Irish, and completed a field trip to Cork to gather data on its profanity
a doctoral student (second assistant) of Professor Walter Schöffler-Henschell at the University of Wiesbaden

Book series
The books in the series are:
2003 Portuguese Irregular Verbs
2003 The Finer Points of Sausage Dogs
2003 At the Villa of Reduced Circumstances
2011 Unusual Uses for Olive Oil
2021 Your Inner Hedgehog

The illustrations in the books are by Iain McIntosh.

External links
Author's page at Random House publishers

Fictional nobility
Fictional German people
Literary characters introduced in 2003
Fictional philologists